Flinton may refer to:

Flinton, East Riding of Yorkshire, United Kingdom
Flinton, Ontario, Canada
Flinton, Queensland, Australia
Flinton Creek, in Ontario, Canada
Ben Flinton, one of the artists for the DC Comics publication All-American Comics
Miss Flinton, a character in Wives Never Know